George Lane may refer to:
 George Lane, better known as Clubfoot George, alleged outlaw who was hanged on January 13, 1864, in Virginia City, Montana
 George Lane (British Army officer) (1915–2010), Hungarian-born British World War II commando
 George Lane (mental calculator) (born 1964), mental calculator and author
 George Lane (minister) (1842–1904), inaugural president-general of the Methodist Church of Australasia
 George Lane (musician), pseudonym for Eric Dolphy (1928–1964) on John Coltrane's Olé Coltrane album
 George Lane (politician) (1856–1925), Canadian cattle baron and legislator
 George Lane (technical analyst) (1921–2004), American technical analyst; developer of the stochastic oscillator model
 George Washington Lane (1806–1863), U.S. federal judge
 George Lane (cricketer) (1852–1917), English cricketer
 George Martin Lane (1823–1897), American scholar
 George Sherman Lane (1902–1981), American linguist
 George Lane, 1st Viscount Lanesborough (1620s–1683), Irish politician
 George W. Lane Jr. (1880–1963), American banker and political candidate
 Chappy Lane (George M. Lane, died 1901), baseball player
 George A. Lane, British historian

See also
George Lane-Fox (disambiguation)